Ballston may refer to:
 Ballston, New York, a town in Saratoga County, New York, US
 Ballston, Oregon, an unincorporated community in Polk County, Oregon, US
 Ballston, Arlington, Virginia, a neighborhood in Arlington County, Virginia, US
 Ballston Spa, New York, a village in Saratoga County, New York
 Ballston Creek, New York
 Ballston Lake, New York